Devmali (also pronounced as Deomali) is a village in Ajmer district, Rajasthan, India. It is popular for its belief that all houses in the village are made of medieval times style. People of this village are predominantly Gurjars, and worship their clan deity Devnarayan.

References 

Villages in Ajmer district